Molla Gol Jan (also Romanized as Mollā Gol Jān and Mollā Goljān; also known as Deh-e Gol Jāl) is a village in Margan Rural District, in the Central District of Hirmand County, Sistan and Baluchestan Province, Iran. At the 2006 census, its population was 198, in 46 families.

References 

Populated places in Hirmand County